An elastic cloud is a cloud computing offering that provides variable service levels based on changing needs.

Elasticity is an attribute that can be applied to most cloud services. It states that the capacity and performance of any given cloud service can expand or contract according to a customer's requirements and that this can potentially be changed automatically as a consequence of some software-driven event or, at worst, can be reconfigured quickly by the customer's infrastructure management team.

Elasticity has been described as one of the five main principles of cloud computing by Rosenburg and Mateos in The Cloud at Your Service - Manning 2011.

History 
Cloud computing was first described by Gillet and Kapor in
1996;
however, the first practical implementation was a consequence of a strategy to
leverage Amazon's excess data center capacity.

Amazon and
other pioneers of the commercial use of this technology were primarily
interested in providing a “public” cloud service, whereby they could offer
customers the benefits of using the cloud, particularly the utility-based
pricing model benefit.

Other suppliers followed suit with a range of cloud-based
models all offering elasticity as a core component, but these suppliers were
only offering this service as an element of their public cloud service.

Due to perceived weaknesses in security, or at least a lack
of proven compliance, many organizations, particularly in the financial and
public sectors, have been slow adopters of cloud technologies. These
wary organizations can achieve some of the benefits of cloud computing by
adopting private
cloud
technologies.

An alternative form of the elastic cloud has been offered
by vendors such as EMC  and
IBM,
whereby the service is based around an enterprise's own infrastructure but
still retains elements of elasticity and the potential to bill by consumption.

Description 
Elasticity in cloud computing is the ability for the
organization to adjust its storage requirements in terms of capacity and
processing with respect to operational requirements. This has the following
benefits:

Operational Benefits - Services
can be acquired quickly, meaning that the evolving requirements of the business
can be addressed almost immediately, giving an organization a potential agility
advantage. A properly implemented elastic system will provision/de-provision
according to application demands, so if a particular business has activity
spikes then the provision can be enabled to match the demand and the capacity
can be re-allocated.

Research and Development (R&D) Projects - R&D activities are no
longer hindered by a requirement to secure a capex budget prior to a project
starting. Capability can simply be provisioned from the cloud and released at
the end of the exercise.

Testing and Deployment - With
most large-scale projects a size test needs to be performed prior to final
rollout. By taking advantage of the elasticity of the cloud and creating a full-scale
avatar of the proposed production system, realistic data and traffic volumes
can be provisioned and released as needed.  

Expensive Resources Allocated - This will normally apply only
in the context where a customer is applying at least some of their own servers
as part of a cloud infrastructure, specifically where a business (for
performance reasons) has decided to invest in solid-state storage as opposed to
spinning platters. There are instances when, due to activity spikes, a less
critical process may need to be moved from the high-performance resources to
more traditional storage.

Server Specification - When
a customer has elected to own/lease hardware, they can select and specify
servers that are specifically tuned to meet the likely needs of their operation
(i.e., directly controlling the cost/benefit equation).

Utility Based Payments - There
is, of course, a key cost driver in this process, and the notion that you
should pay for what you consume is acceptable for many organizations. When
hardware capacity is sourced internally, organizations need to over-provision.
This applies just as much to traditional outsourcing as it does to capex-related
expenditure on in-house servers.

Cloud Platform – At the heart
of any cloud storage system is the ability to manage hyperscale object storage
and a Hadoop
Distributed Files System (HDFS). Elastic storage capability is particularly
well suited to hyperscale 
and Hadoop environments, where its capability to rapidly respond to changing
circumstances and priorities is essential

See also 
 EMC.com
 Software-defined storage
 Object storage 
 Amazon Web Services
 DigitalOcean
 HP Converged Cloud
 IBM Cloud Computing
 Microsoft Azure
 OpenStack
 Rackspace
 Skytap
 VMware

References 

Cloud computing